The Vladimir is a left tributary of the river Gilort in Romania. It flows into the Gilort in Andreești.

References

Rivers of Romania
Rivers of Gorj County